Eva Johnsson (born 1958) is a Swedish Christian Democratic politician. She has been a member of the Riksdag since 2006.

External links
Eva Johnsson at the Riksdag website

Members of the Riksdag from the Christian Democrats (Sweden)
Living people
1958 births
Women members of the Riksdag
21st-century Swedish women politicians
Date of birth missing (living people)